Seyranlık is a village in Silifke district of Mersin Province, Turkey. The population of the village was 190   as of 2012. The main economic activity is farming.

References

Villages in Silifke District